Grzegorz Szamotulski (born 13 May 1976) is a Polish former professional footballer who played as a goalkeeper. He was most recently the goalkeeping coach for Zagłębie Lubin. He has had a nomadic career, playing for 15 clubs in seven countries: Poland, Greece, Austria, Scotland, England, Slovakia and Israel.

Career
Born in Gdańsk, Szamotulski started his career with Lechia Gdańsk before making over 100 appearances for Legia Warsaw. Grzegorz then went on to play for PAOK FC, Śląsk Wrocław, Amica Wronki, Admira Wacker Mödling and Sturm Graz.

Dundee United signed Szamotulski in July 2007 on a six-month contract to cover for the absence of his countryman Łukasz Załuska, who had broken a bone in his foot. He made his debut in a friendly against Barcelona on 26 July 2007. He was nicknamed "The Monk" by Dundee United fans due to his resemblance to the character from the film Mean Machine. Craig Levein admitted that Szamotulski would be leaving the club at the end of his six-month contract, as he had rejected a contract offered by Dundee United.

Szamotulski signed a six-month deal with Preston North End on 6 February 2008, but soon suffered a knee injury. Two months later, and without making an appearance, Szamotulski left Deepdale by "mutual consent".

Szamotulski joined Israeli side F.C. Ashdod in August 2008, but he was released on 3 December. After leaving Ashdod, Szamotulski was linked with a move to Hibernian. Initially a contract could not be agreed with Hibs, but he signed for them on 2 January 2009 until the end of the 2008–09 season.

Szamotulski made his first appearance for Hibs against Hearts as a half-time substitute for Yves Ma-Kalambay. He kept a clean sheet in his first start in a 2–0 league win against St Mirren. Later in the season he kept four successive clean sheets, the first time a Hibs goalkeeper had achieved that feat since 1991. Injury problems affected Szamotulski after this, however, and he left Hibs at the end of the season.

On 26 February 2010, FK DAC 1904 Dunajská Streda from Slovakian first division signed the former Polish international, who was a free agent.

In April 2011, he signed a contract with Korona Kielce. In October 2011, he signed a contract with Warta Poznań.

International career
Szamotulski represented Poland 13 times between 1996 and 2003.

International

Honours
Legia Warsaw
Polish Cup: 1996–97
Polish SuperCup: 1997

See also
 2007–08 Dundee United F.C. season
 2008–09 Hibernian F.C. season

References

External links
 
 
 

1976 births
Living people
Sportspeople from Gdańsk
Sportspeople from Pomeranian Voivodeship
Polish footballers
Association football goalkeepers
Poland international footballers
Hutnik Warsaw players
Lechia Gdańsk players
Polonia Warsaw players
Legia Warsaw players
PAOK FC players
Śląsk Wrocław players
Amica Wronki players
FC Admira Wacker Mödling players
SK Sturm Graz players
Dundee United F.C. players
Preston North End F.C. players
F.C. Ashdod players
Hibernian F.C. players
Jagiellonia Białystok players
FC DAC 1904 Dunajská Streda players
Korona Kielce players
Warta Poznań players
Olimpia Elbląg players
KTS Weszło Warsaw players
English Football League players
Ekstraklasa players
Super League Greece players
Austrian Football Bundesliga players
Scottish Premier League players
Slovak Super Liga players
Israeli Premier League players
Polish expatriate footballers
Expatriate footballers in Greece
Polish expatriate sportspeople in Greece
Expatriate footballers in Austria
Polish expatriate sportspeople in Austria
Polish expatriate sportspeople in Scotland
Expatriate footballers in Scotland
Expatriate footballers in England
Polish expatriate sportspeople in England
Expatriate footballers in Israel
Polish expatriate sportspeople in Israel
Expatriate footballers in Slovakia
Polish expatriate sportspeople in Slovakia
Pogoń Grodzisk Mazowiecki